The canton of Montreuil is a former canton in the Pas-de-Calais department and the Nord-Pas de Calais region. It was disbanded following the French canton reorganisation that came into effect in March 2015. It had a total of 22,203 inhabitants (2012).

Geography
An area of drained marshland and one or two hills, with the town of Montreuil in the Arrondissement of Montreuil at its centre.

The canton comprised 17 communes:

Beaumerie-Saint-Martin
La Calotterie
Campigneulles-les-Grandes
Campigneulles-les-Petites
Cucq
Écuires
Lépine
La Madelaine-sous-Montreuil
Merlimont
Montreuil
Nempont-Saint-Firmin
Neuville-sous-Montreuil
Saint-Aubin
Saint-Josse
Sorrus
Le Touquet-Paris-Plage
Wailly-Beaucamp

Population

See also
 Arrondissements of the Pas-de-Calais department
 Cantons of the Pas-de-Calais department
 Communes of the Pas-de-Calais department

References

Montreuil
2015 disestablishments in France
States and territories disestablished in 2015